The Big Baller Brand International Tournament was a round-robin basketball tournament hosted by Vytautas Prienai–Birštonas of the Lithuanian Basketball League (LKL) that featured three teams from different European countries. It began on February 25 and ended on February 27, 2018, with a total of six games and three games per team. The competition took place at Prienai Arena in Prienai, Lithuania, with the games featuring Vytautas being streamed through Facebook.

Wilki Morskie Szczecin, who play in the Polish Basketball League (PLK), claimed the tournament title after winning all three games and defeating runners-up, the Latvian second-tier VEF Rīga Skola, 94–74 in the deciding game. Slovenian team Helios Suns Domžale and hosts Vytautas Prienai–Birštonas finished in third and fourth place respectively.

History
Following the Big Baller Brand Challenge Games, a series of exhibition games hosted by Vytautas Prienai–Birštonas in January 2018 to feature new American signees LaMelo and LiAngeo Ball, it was announced that the team was planning to hold a similar competition at the end of February. At the time, Vytautas offered several top European youth clubs to participate, and in the following weeks, it was revealed that they had also invited Italian teams. In addition, Vytautas attempted to bring Lithuanian Basketball League (LKL) teams to the competition, but according to team general manager Adomas Kubilius, they turned down the invitations for financial reasons and due to the lack of defense in the exhibition games. On February 19, 2018, Vytautas officially announced the Big Baller Brand International Tournament. The tournament was played in a single round-robin format, with each team meeting all the other teams one time and final standings being determined by record.

The Big Baller Brand International Tournament was sponsored by Big Baller Brand, a sports apparel company owned by LaVar Ball, the father of Vytautas players LaMelo and LiAngelo Ball. LaVar Ball also assumed the head coaching position for Vytautas during the tournament. The games that featured Vytautas were streamed live on Facebook through the Ballislife.com page.

Venue

Teams
The tournament featured four teams, with the three visiting clubs being based outside of Lithuania. VEF Rīga Skola, the youth team of VEF Rīga, was among the competitors.

First round

Helios Suns Domžale vs. Wilki Morskie Szczecin

Vytautas Prienai–Birštonas vs. VEF Rīga Skola
In both teams' debut at the Big Baller brand International Tournament, VEF Rīga Skola defeated Vytautas Prienai–Birštonas with a final score of 144−133. VEF Skola was spearheaded by Nikolajs Zotovs, who led his team with 29 points and 14 assists, along with 10 turnovers. The visiting side was also headlined by Klāvs Čavars and Arnolds Helmanis, who both recorded double-doubles while scoring 25 or more points. Edvinas Šeškus paced Vytautas with 35 points, shooting 13-of-20 from the field, while LiAngelo and LaMelo Ball scored 32 and 31 points respectively. Vytautas led by as many as 29 points in the first quarter, but after the hosts substituted all five starters, VEF Skola quickly reduced their deficit. The offense-driven game marked LaVar Ball's first loss as an assistant or head coach, as he won two games holding either position in the Big Baller Brand Challenge Games.

Second round

Helios Suns Domžale vs. VEF Rīga Skola

Vytautas Prienai–Birštonas vs. Wilki Morskie Szczecin
In the final game of the second round, Wilki Morskie Szczecin improved to 2–0 in the tournament with a decisive 32-point victory over Vytautas Prienai–Birštonas. The winning team was led by Tauras Jogėla, who chipped in a team-high 24 points, and Kyle Benjamin, who notched a double-double of 14 points and 14 rebounds. For Vytautas, LiAngelo Ball led all scorers with 26 points in 40 minutes, shooting 1-of-9 from the three-point line. In 28 minutes, LaMelo Ball recorded nine assists to lead his team, but shot 0-of-7 on three-pointers and had 10 points before being sidelined with a leg injury.

Third round

Wilki Morskie Szczecin vs. VEF Rīga Skola

Vytautas Prienai–Birštonas vs. Helios Suns Domžale
In the concluding game of the Big Baller Brand International Tournament, the Helios Suns Domžale left the tournament with a third-place finish over Vytautas with a 96–87 win. The Helios Suns were led by Urban Oman and Nejc Klavžar with 22 points each, the latter of whom also tied Božo Đumić for assists with 6 each; Đumić also led the team with 8 rebounds. In the aftermath of Vytautas' previous game in the tournament, LaMelo Ball did not play the last game of the tournament. LiAngelo Ball led all scorers with 30 points, while Kervin Bristol led all players with 14 rebounds and Gediminas Maceina recorded a double-double with 11 points and a game-leading 10 assists.

Standings

See also
 Big Baller Brand Challenge Games

References

2017–18 in European basketball leagues
2017–18 in Lithuanian basketball
Basketball competitions in Lithuania